Zbigniew Skowroński (21 September 1925 – 24 February 1992) was a Polish bobsledder. He competed in the two-man and the four-man events at the 1956 Winter Olympics.

References

1925 births
1992 deaths
Polish male bobsledders
Olympic bobsledders of Poland
Bobsledders at the 1956 Winter Olympics
People from Przemyśl